The Gwinnett County Public School District is a school district operating in Gwinnett County, Georgia, United States.  GCPS is the largest school system in Georgia, with over 120 school buildings and an estimated enrollment of over 188,000 students for the 2017–2018 year.  GCPS is estimated to be the 14th largest school district in the U.S. The district has its headquarters in an unincorporated area near Suwanee.

Niche rates GCPS as A+ and within the top 25 school systems in Georgia. In addition, GCPS have not only served as a model for the state but for the entire nation as recently twice, in 2010 and 2014, winning the prestigious Broad Prize for Urban Education for being the top urban school district in the nation. 2014 was the last year the prize was awarded, GCPS was one of only two school districts to win the prize twice, and GCPS was the first district to have won the prize before and win it again in its first year of eligibility to again win the prize.

Schools 
The district's schools are grouped into 19 geographical attendance zones referred to as "clusters." Each cluster includes at least one high school, for which it is named.

Archer cluster 
Cooper Elementary School
Harbins Elementary School
Lovin Elementary School
McConnell Middle School
Archer High School

Berkmar cluster 
Bethesda Elementary School
Corley Elementary School
Hopkins Elementary School
Kanoheda Elementary School
Minor Elementary School
Berkmar Middle School
Sweetwater Middle School
Berkmar High School

Brookwood cluster 
Brookwood Elementary School
Craig Elementary School
Gwin Oaks Elementary School
Head Elementary School
CrewsMS Crews Middle School
Five Forks Middle School
Brookwood High School

Central Gwinnett cluster 
Jenkins Elementary School
Lawrenceville Elementary School
Simonton Elementary School
Winn Holt Elementary School
Jordan Middle School 
Moore Middle School
Central Gwinnett High School

Collins Hill cluster 
 McKendree Elementary School
 Rock Springs Elementary School
 Taylor Elementary School
 Walnut Grove Elementary School
 Creekland Middle School
 Collins Hill High School

Dacula cluster 
 Alcova Elementary School
 Dacula Elementary School
 Mulberry Elementary School
 Dacula Middle School
 Dacula High School

Discovery cluster
 Alford Elementary School
 Baggett Elementary School 
 Benefield Elementary School
 Cedar Hill Elementary School
 Richards Middle School
 Discovery High School

Duluth cluster 
 Berkeley Lake Elementary School
 Chattahoochee Elementary School
 Chesney Elementary School
 Harris Elementary School
 Coleman Middle School 
 Duluth Middle School
 Duluth High School

Grayson cluster 
 Grayson Elementary School
 Pharr Elementary School
 Starling Elementary School
 Trip Elementary School
 Bay Creek Middle School
 Couch Middle School
 Grayson High School

Lanier cluster 
 Sugar Hill Elementary School
 Sycamore Elementary School SycamoreES]
 White Oak Elementary School
 Lanier Middle School
 Lanier High School

Meadowcreek cluster 
 Ferguson Elementary School
 Graves Elementary School
 Lilburn Elementary School
 McClure Health Science High School
 Meadowcreek Elementary School
 Nesbit Elementary School
 Rockbridge Elementary School
 Lilburn Middle School
 Radloff Middle School]
 Meadowcreek High School

Mill Creek cluster 
 Duncan Creek Elementary School
 Fort Daniel Elementary School
 Puckett's Mill Elementary School
 Osborne Middle School
 Mill Creek High School

Mountain View cluster 
 Dyer Elementary School
 Freeman's Mill Elementary School
 Woodward Mill Elementary School
 Twin Rivers Middle School
 Mountain View High School

Norcross cluster 
 Baldwin Elementary School 
 Beaver Ridge Elementary School
 Norcross Elementary School
 Peachtree Elementary School
 Simpson Elementary School
 Stripling Elementary School
 Pinckneyville Middle School
 Summerour Middle School
 Norcross High School
 Paul Duke STEM High School

North Gwinnett cluster 
 Level Creek Elementary School
 Riverside Elementary School
 Roberts Elementary School
 Suwanee Elementary School
 North Gwinnett Middle School
 North Gwinnett High School

Parkview cluster 
 Arcado Elementary School
 Camp Creek Elementary School
 Knight Elementary School
 Mountain Park Elementary School
 Trickum Middle School
 Parkview High School

Peachtree Ridge cluster 
 Burnette Elementary School
 Mason Elementary School
 Jackson Elementary School
 Parsons Elementary School
 Richard Hull Middle School
 Northbrook Middle School
 Peachtree Ridge High School

Seckinger cluster (2022–2023) 
 Harmony Elementary School
 Ivy Creek Elementary School
 Patrick Elementary School
 Jones Middle School
 Seckinger High School

Shiloh cluster 
 Anderson-Livsey Elementary School
 Annistown Elementary School
 Centerville Elementary School
 Partee Elementary School
 Shiloh Elementary School
 Shiloh Middle School
 Shiloh High School

South Gwinnett cluster 
 Britt Elementary School
 Magill Elementary School
 Norton Elementary School
 Rosebud Elementary School
 Grace Snell Middle School
 Snellville Middle School
 South Gwinnett High School

Other programs 
Several schools and programs operate outside of the clusters to serve specific student needs. These include the following:
 ADAPT
 GIVE Center East High School
 GIVE Center East Middle School
 GIVE Center West High School
 GIVE Center West Middle School
 Gwinnett Online Campus
 International Transition Center
 Gwinnett School of Mathematics, Science, and Technology
 Maxwell High School of Technology
 New Life Academy of Excellence Inc.
 North Metro Academy of Performing Arts
 Oakland Meadow School
 Phoenix High School
 STRIVE
 The BRIDGE

Safety and Security 

The district operates a school police department with full police powers under Georgia law. The department consists of 74 Police Officer Standards and Training certified (P.O.S.T.) armed officers, five full-time office staff members, eight dispatchers, and 24 non-police crossing guards.

The department is divided into four zones: North (including, Collins Hill, Discovery, GIVE East, Lanier, North Gwinnett, and Peachtree Ridge), South (including Brookwood, Grayson, Parkview, Shiloh, and South Gwinnett), East (including Archer, Central Gwinnett, Dacula, Mill Creek, and Mountain View), and West (including Berkmar, Duluth, GIVE West, Meadowcreek, and Norcross).

The officers are responsible for mentoring, counseling, education, and event security in addition to their normal duties as school security officers.

See also 

 Bown v. Gwinnett County School District
 Franklin v. Gwinnett County Public Schools
 List of school districts in Georgia (U.S. state)

References

External links
 Gwinnett County Public Schools
 GCPS names its top counselors of the year (2016)

School districts in Georgia (U.S. state)
Education in Gwinnett County, Georgia